Andrei Nikolaevich Moskvin (14 February 1901, Tsarskoe Selo – 28 February 1961, Leningrad) was a Soviet cinematographer, renowned for his work with Grigori Kozintsev and Leonid Trauberg.

Selected filmography 
 The Devil's Wheel (1926); directed by Grigori Kozintsev and Leonid Trauberg
 The Overcoat (1926); directed by Grigori Kozintsev and Leonid Trauberg
 Somebody Else's Coat (1927); directed by Boris Shpis
 The Club of the Big Deed (1927); directed by Grigori Kozintsev and Leonid Trauberg
 Little Brother (1927); directed by Grigori Kozintsev and Leonid Trauberg
 The New Babylon (1929); directed by Grigori Kozintsev and Leonid Trauberg
 Alone (1931); directed by Grigori Kozintsev and Leonid Trauberg
 The Youth of Maxim (1935); directed by Grigori Kozintsev and Leonid Trauberg
 The Return of Maxim (1937); directed by Grigori Kozintsev and Leonid Trauberg
 The Vyborg Side (1938); directed by Grigori Kozintsev and Leonid Trauberg
 The Young Fritz (1943); directed by Grigori Kozintsev and Leonid Trauberg
 Actress (1943); directed by Leonid Trauberg
 Simple People (1946); directed by Grigori Kozintsev and Leonid Trauberg
 Pirogov (1947); directed by Grigori Kozintsev
 Belinsky (1953); directed by Grigori Kozintsev
 The Gadfly (1955); directed by Aleksandr Fajntsimmer
 Stories about Lenin (1957); directed by Sergei Yutkevich
 Don Quixote (1957); directed by Grigori Kozintsev
 Ivan the Terrible (1945); directed by Sergei Eisenstein
 The Lady with the Dog (1960); directed by Iosif Kheifits

References

External links 
 

1901 births
1961 deaths
People from Pushkin, Saint Petersburg
People from Tsarskoselsky Uyezd
Soviet cinematographers